Following are the results of the 2010 Finnish Athletics Championships.  The games, known as Kalevan kisat in Finnish, were first held in Tampere in 1907.  The 2010 events were held August 5 through 8th in Kajaani.

Results

References

2010 Finnish Athletics Championships Results 

Finnish Athletics Championships
2010 in Finnish sport
Finnish